Barbara ("Barb") Metz Lindquist (born July 1, 1969, in Wilmington, Delaware) is a triathlete from the United States.

Lindquist competed at the second Olympic triathlon at the 2004 Summer Olympics. She took ninth place with a total time of 2:06:25.49.

External links
Barb's Website

1969 births
Living people
American female triathletes
Triathletes at the 2004 Summer Olympics
Olympic triathletes of the United States
Sportspeople from Wilmington, Delaware
21st-century American women